Raul-Yuri Georgievich Ervier (16 April 1909 – 9 August 1991) was a Soviet geologist and director of the main Tyumen production geological department (“Glavtyumengeologiya”). He was head of wide-ranging geological explorations that discovered of the largest oil and gas fields in Western Siberia.

Biography

He was born 16 April 1909 in Tiflis, to a French emigrant’s family. He finished school in his native town. In 1923 he began working as a student - assistant of a foreman of a soap plant in Tbilisi.

In 1929 he joined the Melitopol gas expedition. Since that moment he was linked with geology until the end of his life. In 1933 he finished the High Engineer Courses in Kiev. He worked with various geological groups in the Ukraine until 1941.

He served in the Great Patriotic War after August 1941. He served in sapper units, was the commander of individual detachment of deep drilling of a sapper battalion. Took part in defense and liberation of Ukraine and Northern Caucasus. He was demobilized in December 1944 at the rank of major – engineer.

From 1945 through 1952 Ervier worked as the head of South – Moldavian oil exploration of trust “Moldavneftegeologiya”.

In August 1952 he was assigned to Tyumen oil and gas exploring expedition. Since 1955 he was the main engineer of Tyumen gas and oil exploring trust. Since 1956 he was the director of the trust, later the department of “Tyumenneftegeologiya”. The head of main committee “Glavtyumengeologiya” in 1966-1977.

On 29 April 1963 Yuri Georgievich Ervier was awarded the star of the Hero of Socialist Labour and the order of Lenin and a gold medal “Hammer and Sickle” for outstanding achievements in discovering and exploration of mineral deposits.

In April 1964 he was among the group of specialists and scientists awarded the Lenin prize for “grounding of aspects of foulness and oil – bearing capacity of Western Siberia plain”.

Such people, as F. K. Salmanov, A. M. Brehuntsov, V. T. Podshibyakin, V. D. Tokarev,  L. I. Rovnin, I. Y. Girya, A. G. Yudin, V. A. Abazarov, have honourably continued the course, started by Y. G. Ervier.

During his management more than 250 fields of oil and gas were discovered, some of them are unique: Mamontovskoe, Pravdinskoe, Samotlorskoe, Fedorovskoe, Holmogorskoe (of oil) and Zapolyarnoe, Medveshye, Urengoyskoe, Yamburgskoe (of gas). Explored supplies of oil are estimated at 10 billions tons, condensate - at 0.5 billions tons, gas – at 20 trillions m^3.

In 1977 he was appointed deputy minister of geology of the USSR and held this position until retirement in 1981.

On 16 April 1984 for his contribution to development of a national economy of Tyumen, its formation as the center of an oil and gas extraction complex of Western Siberia, Yuri Ervier got the rank of the honourable citizen of Tyumen.

Yuri Georgievich Ervier died on 9 August 1991 in Moscow. He was buried in Thervishevskoe graveyard in Tyumen, to the right of its main entrance.

Awards
 Hero of Socialist Labour (1963)
 Two Orders of Lenin (1963, 1976)
 Order of the October Revolution (1971)
 Order of the Red Banner of Labour, twice (1959, 1968)
 Order of the Patriotic War, 2nd class (1985)
 Order of the Red Star (1943)
 Medal "For the Defence of Odessa"
 Medal "For the Defence of the Caucasus"
 Medal "For the Victory over Germany in the Great Patriotic War 1941–1945"
 Lenin Prize (1964)

Memorials
His name was given to a street in Tyumen and a charity fund of Russian geologists.

On 14 April 2006 in Tyumen a monument to Ervier who had worked in “Glavtyumengeologiya” for many years was opened in Respublika street. The text on the monument says: “To Ervier Yuri Georgievich – from grateful Tyumen”.

References

External links 
 Magazine «Oil of Russia» about Y.G. Ervier
 Fund of geologists of a name Y. G. Ervier
 Here you can hear the voice of Yuri Georgievich Ervier
 «All the same the firsts forever remain the firsts» Magazine «Chemistry and life» 1987 year, № 4, pages 6–13

Russian explorers
Soviet geologists
Russian geologists
Heroes of Socialist Labour
Recipients of the Order of the Red Star
Recipients of the Order of Lenin
Lenin Prize winners
Honourable citizens of Khanty-Mansi Autonomous Okrug
1909 births
1991 deaths
Soviet military personnel of World War II
Soviet people of French descent
People from the Russian Empire of French descent
People from Tiflis Governorate
Scientists from Tbilisi